{{DISPLAYTITLE:C7H10}}
The molecular formula C7H10 may refer to:

 Cycloheptadienes
 1,3-Cycloheptadiene
 1,4-Cycloheptadiene
Norbornene
 [2.2.1]Propellane
 [3.1.1]Propellane